Vijay is a 1989 Indian Telugu-language action film, produced by Venkat Akkineni under the Annapurna Studios banner and directed by B. Gopal. It stars Nagarjuna,  Vijayashanti  and music composed by Chakravarthy.

Cast

Nagarjuna as Vijay
Vijayashanti
Mohan Babu
Jayasudha
Jaggayya
Nutan Prasad
Sarath Babu
Allu Ramalingaiah
Suthi Velu
Narra Venkateswara Rao
Chalapathi Rao
Vijayaranga Raju
P. L. Narayana
Ramana Reddy
Chidatala Appa Rao
Chitti Babu
Gowtham Raju
Jenny
Sandhya 
Tatineni Rajeswari
Y. Vijaya
Nirmalamma

Soundtrack

The music was composed by Chakravarthy. Music was released on AMC Audio Company.

References

External links

1989 films
1980s Telugu-language films
Films directed by B. Gopal
Films scored by K. Chakravarthy